Butanone, also known as methyl ethyl ketone (MEK), is an organic compound with the formula CH3C(O)CH2CH3. This colourless liquid ketone has a sharp, sweet odor reminiscent of acetone. It is produced industrially on a large scale, but occurs in nature only in trace amounts. It is partially soluble in water, and is commonly used as an industrial solvent. It is an isomer of another solvent, tetrahydrofuran.

Production
Butanone may be produced by oxidation of 2-butanol. The dehydrogenation of 2-butanol is catalysed by copper, zinc, or bronze:
CH3CH(OH)CH2CH3   →   CH3C(O)CH2CH3  +  H2

This is used to produce approximately 700 million kilograms yearly. Other syntheses that have been examined but not implemented include Wacker oxidation of 2-butene and oxidation of isobutylbenzene, which is analogous to the industrial production of acetone. The cumene process can be modified to produce phenol and a mixture of acetone and butanone instead of only phenol and acetone in the original.

Both liquid-phase oxidation of heavy naphtha and the Fischer–Tropsch reaction produce mixed oxygenate streams, from which 2-butanone is extracted by fractionation.

Applications

As a solvent 
Butanone is an effective and common solvent and is used in processes involving gums, resins, cellulose acetate and nitrocellulose coatings and in vinyl films. For this reason it finds use in the manufacture of plastics, textiles, in the production of paraffin wax, and in household products such as lacquer, varnishes, paint remover, a denaturing agent for denatured alcohol, glues, and as a cleaning agent. It has similar solvent properties to acetone but boils at a higher temperature and has a significantly slower evaporation rate. Unlike acetone, it forms an azeotrope with water, making it useful for azeotropic distillation of moisture in certain applications. Butanone is also used in dry erase markers as the solvent of the erasable dye.

As a plastic welding agent 
As butanone dissolves polystyrene and many other plastics, it is sold as "model cement" for use in connecting parts of scale model kits.  Though often considered an adhesive, it is actually functioning as a welding agent in this context.

Other uses
Butanone is the precursor to methyl ethyl ketone peroxide, which is a catalyst for some polymerization reactions such as crosslinking of unsaturated polyester resins. Dimethylglyoxime can be prepared from butanone first by reaction with ethyl nitrite to give diacetyl monoxime followed by conversion to the dioxime:

In the Peroxide process on producing hydrazine, the starting chemical ammonia is bonded to butanone, oxidized by hydrogen peroxide, bonded to another ammonia molecule.

In the final step of the process, a hydrolysis produces the desired product hydrazine and regenerates the butanone.
Me(Et)C=NN=C(Et)Me + 2 H2O → 2 Me(Et)C=O + N2H4

Safety

Flammability
Butanone can react with most oxidizing materials, and can produce fires. It is moderately explosive, requiring only a small flame or spark to cause a vigorous reaction. The vapour is heavier than air, so it can accumulate at low points. It is explosive at concentrations between 1.4 and 11.4%. Concentrations in the air high enough to be flammable are intolerable to humans due to the irritating nature of the vapor. Butanone fires should be extinguished with carbon dioxide, dry agents, or alcohol-resistant foam.

Health effects
Butanone is a constituent of tobacco smoke. It is an irritant, causing irritation to the eyes and nose of humans.  Serious health effects in animals have been seen only at very high levels. There are no long-term studies with animals breathing or drinking it, and no studies for carcinogenicity in animals breathing or drinking it.
There is some evidence that butanone can potentiate the toxicity of other solvents, in contrast to the calculation of mixed solvent exposures by simple addition of exposures.

, the United States Environmental Protection Agency (EPA) listed butanone as a toxic chemical. There are reports of neuropsychological effects. It is rapidly absorbed through undamaged skin and lungs. It contributes to the formation of ground-level ozone, which is toxic in low concentrations.

Butanone is listed as a Table II precursor under the United Nations Convention Against Illicit Traffic in Narcotic Drugs and Psychotropic Substances.

Regulation
Emission of butanone was regulated in the US as a hazardous air pollutant, because it is a volatile organic compound contributing to the formation of tropospheric (ground-level) ozone. In 2005, the US Environmental Protection Agency removed butanone from the list of hazardous air pollutants (HAPs).

See also 
 Butyraldehyde 
 Butane
 n-Butanol
 2-Butanol

Notes

References

External links
International Chemical Safety Card 0179
National Pollutant Inventory: Methyl Ethyl Ketone Fact Sheet
NIOSH Pocket Guide to Chemical Hazards
US EPA Datasheet

Alkanones
Ketone solvents
Pollutants
Commodity chemicals
Sweet-smelling chemicals